Patalesvara Siva Temple – II is a Shiva temple located in Bhubaneswar, Orissa, India. This temple dates back to the 10th/11th century and is partly buried and broken.

Location
Patalesvara Siva temple is located on the right side of the Talabazar road leading from Kedara-Gouri temple to Lingaraja temple. The geographical coordinates are Lat. 20°14’41" N., Long. 85° 50’ 06"E., The temple is at an elevation of 75 feet.

Ownership
Single/Multiple: Multiple
Public/Private: Public

Property Type
Precinct/Building/Structure/Landscape/Site/Tank: Building
Subtype: Temple
Typology:Rekha Deul

Physical Description

Surroundings
The temple is surrounded by Ananta Basudeva temple in the east across the road, Bindusagar tank in west.

Architectural features
The temple is buried up to half of the jangha.
The temple has bada, gandi and mastaka. The bada of the temple above the present surface measures 2.50 metres, gandi measures 3 m and mastaka measures 1 m in height. The building material is sandstone and construction technique is dry masonry. The style is predominantly Kalingam.

Grade

Threats to property

Conservation Problem and Remedies
Besides the rain water percolating from the roof, the rain water from the road also enters into the sanctum, which is creating great problems on account of the temple's proximity to Bindusagara and low elevation of the sanctum. As a result, the deity remains submerged throughout the year.

Detached and loose sculptures
There is an Udyota Simha on the left side of the doorjamb.

References 

Hindu temples in Bhubaneswar